Parliamentary elections were held in Sri Lanka on 16 August 1994. They marked the decisive end of seventeen years of United National Party rule and a revival of Sri Lankan democracy.

Background
Democracy in Sri Lanka had seemed doomed as the presidencies of J.R. Jayewardene and Ranasinghe Premadasa arbitrarily banned opposition parties, severely muzzled the media, and routinely used death squads, torture, and kidnappings in the two civil conflicts against the LTTE and JVP.  The UNP had simply cancelled the 1983 parliamentary elections; its control of the media led it to victory in the 1988 and 1989 elections.

The population was increasingly tired of war and repression, worn out with jingoistic Sinhalese nationalism, and wanted a return to freedom, peace, and democracy.  Chandrika Kumaratunga, leader of the Sri Lanka Freedom Party, formed a coalition with small leftist parties called the People's Alliance.  This was in some ways a revival of her mother's coalition from the 1970s, but this time campaigning for rapprochement with the Tamils rather than their marginalization.

Results
The PA did not win a majority, but was able to govern with the support of the smaller parties.

By province

By electoral district

Elected members

Legacy
The 1994 election did not live up to its great hopes.  The PA government was unable to come to an agreement with the LTTE, and ended up prosecuting war just as brutally as its UNP predecessor.  The Executive Presidency, which Kumaratunga had promised to abolish, remained as powerful as before.

Notes

References

 
 
 

 
Parliamentary elections in Sri Lanka
Sri Lanka
Sri Lanka